My Degeneration is the fourth studio album by the punk rock band Flashlight Brown. It is the band's first major-label release.

This album came to be after Rob Cavallo contacted the band during one of their many tours of Canada. Cavallo was interested in recording two songs with the band, but this quickly turned into an entire album. The band was subsequently signed to Hollywood Records and released this calling it a "culmination of a 6 year career of living on the edge between a dream and despair".

The band would release "Ready to Roll" as a single off the album, with the song receiving minor playtime on Much Music and Edge 102. "Ready to Roll" would also find its way on to the Rugrats Go Wild! Soundtrack.

Track listing

Personnel
Flashlight Brown
Fil Bucchino – Bass guitar, lead vocals, piano
Matt Hughes – Guitar, vocals
Mike Conroy – Guitar
Tim Thomson – Drums

Production
Rob Cavallo – Producer 
Dan Burns, Daniel Chase, Doug McKean – Pro-Tools
Greg Goldman – engineer
Allison Hamamura – A&R
Cheryl Jenets – Project Coordinator
Josh Ketchmark – Guitar Technician
Chris Lord-Alge – Mixing 
Robert Vosgien – Mastering

2003 albums
Hollywood Records albums